The Schilling School for Gifted Children is a K-12 private coeducational day school for gifted and talented students located in Cincinnati, Ohio. It was founded by Dr. Sandra Kelly Schilling in 1997. The school employs an accelerated curriculum, and classes are formed according to student ability, as opposed to grade level.

It was named in Cincinnati Magazine's August 2007 edition as the second best private school in the greater Cincinnati area. The school is also one of only two schools in the United States serving gifted children in grades K-12.

Faculty
The faculty is composed of gifted adults who are experienced teachers, subject specialists, and practitioners in their fields of expertise, many of whom are currently teaching at local universities. Approximately 20 percent of the staff have doctorates and 75 percent have their master's degrees.

Students
Students must have an IQ of at least 130 for admission. 49 students attend the school for the 2022-2023 school year. The Schilling School has the highest average SAT score among Greater Cincinnati public and private high schools. 45% of the students have IQ's between 130 and 144, and 55% are between 145 and 200.

References

External links

High schools in Hamilton County, Ohio
Private schools in Cincinnati
Private high schools in Ohio
Private middle schools in Ohio
Private elementary schools in Ohio
Educational institutions established in 1997
1997 establishments in Ohio